NGC 5613 is a lenticular galaxy (type S0a) in the constellation Boötes. It is part of the Arp 178 set of interacting galaxies, with NGC 5615 and NGC 5614.

References

External links
 
 Image NGC 5613
 http://seds.org/
 SIMBAD data

Boötes
5613
09228
51433
Interacting galaxies
+06-32-021
Lenticular galaxies